Zafar Iqbal Zafri  is a Pakistani melody singer and a playback singer in Lollywood Pakistan.

Album list
Janejaan
Bhool ja Mere Dil
Mein To Har Mor Pe
Aur Is Dil Mein
Agar Bewafa Thujh Ko
Piyar Ki Bhool
Mere Dushman Tu Meri
Dil Mein HO Tum
Dooriyaan
Dil kiya karey
Dil Da Jani
Chori Chori
Dil Se Tera Nam Mit Jaye Dua Karna
Sharabi Ghazlen
Mere Mehboob Qayamat Hogi

References

Pakistani male singers
Living people
Year of birth missing (living people)